The 5th Battalion (Western Cavalry), CEF, known as "Tuxford's Dandys," was an infantry battalion of the Canadian Expeditionary Force during the Great War.

History
The 5th Battalion was authorized on 10 August 1914 and embarked for Great Britain on 29 September 1915.  It entered the theatre of operations in France on 14 February 1915, where it fought as part of the 2nd Canadian Infantry Brigade, 1st Canadian Division in France and Flanders until the end of the war. The battalion was disbanded on 15 September 1920.

The 5th Battalion recruited in Brandon, Manitoba; Saskatoon, Regina and Moose Jaw, Saskatchewan; Red Deer, Alberta and Merritt and Vernon, British Columbia and was mobilized at Camp Valcartier, Quebec.

The battalion fought in the attack on Vimy Ridge with 14 officers and 350 other ranks killed or wounded.

The 5th Battalion had five officers commanding:
Lieutenant-Colonel George Tuxford, 22 September 1915-January 11, 1916 
Lieutenant-Colonel H.M. Dyer, DSO, 11 January 1916 – 29 June 1917
Lieutenant-Colonel L.P.O. Tudor, DSO, 29 June 1917 – 8 March 1918
Lieutenant-Colonel L.L. Crawford, DSO, 8 March 1918 – 4 April 1918
Lieutenant-Colonel L.P.O. Tudor, DSO, 4 April 1918-Demobilization

Sgt. Raphael Louis Zengel of the 5th Battalion was awarded the Victoria Cross for his action on 9 August 1918 at Warvillers, France. He had previously been awarded the Military Medal.

Battle honours 
The 5th Battalion was awarded the following battle honours in 1929:
YPRES, 1915, '17
Gravenstafel
St. Julien
FESTUBERT, 1915
MOUNT SORREL
SOMME, 1916
Thiepval
Ancre Heights
ARRAS, 1917, '18
Vimy, 1917
Arleux
HILL 70
Passchendaele
AMIENS
Scarpe, 1918
Drocourt-Quéant
HINDENBURG LINE
Canal du Nord
PURSUIT TO MONS
FRANCE AND FLANDERS, 1915-18

Perpetuation 
The perpetuation of the 5th Battalion (Western Cavalry), CEF, was initially assigned in 1920 to 1st Battalion, The North Saskatchewan Regiment, and has been passed down through the following units:
 1920–1924: 1st Battalion (5th Battalion, CEF), The North Saskatchewan Regiment
 1924–1936: 1st Battalion (5th Battalion, CEF), The Saskatoon Light Infantry
 1936–1955: The Saskatoon Light Infantry (Machine Gun)
 1955–1958: The North Saskatchewan Regiment (Machine Gun)
 1958–present: The North Saskatchewan Regiment

See also 

 List of infantry battalions in the Canadian Expeditionary Force

References

Sources
Canadian Expeditionary Force 1914-1919 by Col G.W.L. Nicholson, CD, Queens's Printer, Ottawa, Ontario, 1962
5th Battalion, Canadian Expeditionary Force Study Group

External links

005
Military units and formations of Manitoba
Military units and formations of Saskatchewan
Military units and formations of Alberta
Military units and formations of British Columbia
Saskatoon Light Infantry
North Saskatchewan Regiment